The Girl Who Had Everything is a 1953 American romantic drama film directed by Richard Thorpe and produced by Armande Deutsch for Metro-Goldwyn-Mayer.  The film features William Powell in his last MGM feature and one of his last film roles before retirement.

The screenplay was written by Art Cohn, based upon a 1928 play by Willard Mack, which in turn was based on the 1927 novel A Free Soul by Adela Rogers St. Johns. The play and novel were also inspiration for an earlier film adaptation called A Free Soul (1931).

The film follows Steve Latimer (William Powell), a successful defense attorney, who has tried to give his daughter Jean (Elizabeth Taylor) everything he can in life.  She decides to leave her boyfriend, the amiable Vance Court (Gig Young), for Victor Ramondi (Fernando Lamas), a rakish and dangerous man with underworld connections whom Steve is representing. Steve tries to warn Jean away from Victor, but she accepts his proposal of marriage.

Plot
Jean lives with her widowed father, defense lawyer Steve Latimer who had recently agreed to defend gambler Victor Y. Ramondi  in a trial against the senate on the basis of charges for gambling and organized crime. Prior to the six-day trial, Jean's long-term boyfriend, Vance Court asked once again for her hand in marriage, yet she politely declines claiming she is not yet ready to get married. Vance, while disappointed, agrees that it is fair for her to have "a little more time" but not too much, as he would like to settle down with her soon.

During the trial, Jean and Victor Ramondi become acquainted through their connections to Steve Latimer and immediately have undeniable chemistry. During their first night together, they converse over dinner, laugh, and Jean even opens up to Vic and nonchalantly expresses her worries about her father's struggle with alcoholism. Victor acts in a very suave and composed manner and proves himself a gentleman to Jean, which further piques her interest in him. Jean is intrigued by the fact that Victor is known to be a "bad boy" and not simply a safe choice like Vance. Given that Jean had been the girl-who-had-everything throughout her life due to her father, she wanted to have Victor too. The spark between Jean and Ramondi continues to ignite when Victor outbids Vance in an auction in Lexington, Kentucky for a $20,000 colt, which he later gives to Jean as a gift.

As Ramondi's defense attorney, Steve was aware of the tricks and malintentions of Victor and sees it necessary to warn his daughter of Ramondi's deceitful past, for he knows Victor would have never invested such a large sum of money without wanting something else in return. Although Jean acknowledges her father and initially grows upset with Victor, she continues to pursue him, as she claims she knows what she feels and cannot help those feelings. In the meantime, she agrees to her father's proposal to take a short vacation with him to the Smokies to clear her head. However, after only a few short days, she can barely stand to be apart from Victor and soon departs to New York to see him.

Upon their arrival in New York, Victor receives a newspaper article disclosing the information that the trials against him may reopen due to the discovery of classified information provided by a "mystery witness", later revealed to be Steve. Ramondi grows enraged and flustered, knowing that Steve Latimer has the power to expose his crimes and misdemeanors to the world and ruin his reputation and his chances with Jean. The two men both proceed to threaten each other in a big argument. While Steve cannot directly testify against Ramondi in court, he claims he can easily bring in witnesses who can attest to Victor's murder of two mobster brothers. Meanwhile, Victor maliciously threatens Steve with physical harm if he attempts to go to Washington to testify. During this argument, the true character of Ramondi is exposed to Jean, who is finally able to see him for the man he truly is. He hits both her father and her out of anger, and even though he apologizes to her saying it was out of anger in that moment, she finally realizes her father was right all along and calls off their engagement.

Victor departs, and while he is stopped at a traffic light in his car he is shot and killed by a man in an adjacent truck. When the news reporters come by to interview the Latimers the following day, they express to the reporters that Ramondi was a gambler, and he lost his own game. In the closing scene, Jean and Steve reconcile and embrace each other with a long, heartfelt hug, for his intuition about Ramondi was right all along, and it was only a matter of time before Jean was able to see it.

Cast

Reception
According to MGM records the film made $739,000 in the US and Canada and $479,000 elsewhere, resulting in a profit of $116,000.

References

External links
 
 
 
 

1953 films
1950s English-language films
Films scored by André Previn
American films based on plays
1950s legal films
Metro-Goldwyn-Mayer films
Films directed by Richard Thorpe
1953 romantic drama films
American romantic drama films
Remakes of American films
Films based on works by Adela Rogers St. Johns
American black-and-white films
1950s American films